Zelzal-3 (meaning "earthquake") is an Iranian-made solid propellant guided artillery rocket with a range of 200 km. It is an upgrade of the Zelzal-2 rocket with slightly improved range and was first shown to the public in 2007. A variant, the Zelzal-3B, has a smaller warhead and a range of 250 km. The shape and dimensions of the Zelzal-3 are nearly identical with previous versions except that the nosecone is cone shaped rather than the dome shaped Zelzal-2 and Zelzal-1. The Zelzal-3 has received little use as the much more accurate Fateh-110 missile was also developed from the Zelzal-2.

A number of sources confuse the Zelzal-3 with the Shahab-3 ballistic missile.

Operators

 
 
Houthis have a rocket they call the Zelzal-3, which they claim it is locally-made and not imported from Iran.

See also
 Zelzal-1
 Zelzal-2
 Fateh-110
 Military of Iran
 Iran's missile forces
 Iranian military industry
 Current Equipment of the Iranian Army

References

Weapons of Iran
Ballistic missiles of Iran
Military equipment introduced in the 2000s